Blackheath is a  biological Site of Special Scientific Interest south-east of Guildford in Surrey.

This area of dry lowland heath and acid grassland is managed for conservation and fauna includes a wide range of breeding birds, the vulnerable heathland spider Oxyopes heterophthalmus and the rare beetle Lomechusoides strumosa. There is also woodland which has a rare moss, Dicranum polysetum.

Blackheath Lane and Littleford Lane go through the site.

References

Sites of Special Scientific Interest in Surrey